Adrien is a given name and surname.

Adrien may also refer to:
Adrien (1943 film), a French film
Adrien (2015 film), a Canadian film
 Adrien (opera), a 1799 opera by Méhul
 Adrien (dancer) (1816–1870), French dancer and choreographer

See also 
 Adrian (disambiguation)
 Adrienne (disambiguation)